Shakespeare is a 370 km diameter impact basin in the Shakespeare quadrangle of Mercury, which is named after this crater. It is located at 48.1°N, 152.3°W and is named after playwright William Shakespeare.

References

Impact craters on Mercury